Pampadum Shola National Park is the smallest national park in Idukki district of Kerala in India. It is on the border with Dindigul district of Tamil Nadu. The park is administered by the Kerala Department of Forests and Wildlife, Munnar Wildlife Division, together with the nearby Mathikettan Shola National Park, Eravikulam National Park, Anamudi Shola National Park, Chinnar Wildlife Sanctuary and the Kurinjimala Sanctuary. The park adjoins the Allinagaram Reserved Forest within the proposed Palani Hills Wildlife Sanctuary and National Park.It  is a part of Palani hills stretched up  to Vandaravu peak. The Westerns Ghats, Anamalai Sub-Cluster, including these parks, is under consideration by the UNESCO World Heritage Committee for selection as a World Heritage Site.

Etymology
The name´"Pampadum Shola" means, "the forest where the snake dances", derived from three Malayalam words, "paampu(പാംപ്)", which means "snake"; "aattam", means "dance"; and "chola(ചോല), means "grassy forests near the high range". "Shola" may be considered an anglicized version of "chola".

Flora
The park protects a moderate amount of montane evergreen shola forest that is associated with the wildlife rich Eravikulam National Park.

There are various types of medicinal plants (herbs), of which studies have been made. After the forest range there are grandis (a variety of eucalyptus) that threatens the ecology of the area due to its dehydrating and quick-spreading character. These trees as well as the private legal and illegal plantations of the same trees remain as a living danger. The eucalyptus trees (grandis) that eat up the unique eco-system is yet to be a consideration of the forestry. The national park with its unique richness of uncontaminated "humus", has been an interest of studies recently.

Fauna

The keystone species here is the highly elusive and endangered, endemic small carnivore – the Nilgiri marten. Leopards and Indian wild dogs are sometimes sighted at dusk or dawn, tigers are an important animal of the park. The Old Kodaikanal–Munnar Road nearby is closed due to the growing population of wildlife such as elephants, buffaloes, lion tailed macaque, gaur and Nilgiri langurs.

Some notable birds found here include the Nilgiri wood-pigeon, white-bellied shortwing, vernal hanging parrot, blue rock-thrush, blue-capped rock-thrush and Nilgiri flycatcher,  and black-and-orange flycatchers.

Visiting

The Forest Department provides opportunity to experience the beauty of Pampadum Shola National Park to the curious tourists and research fellows. A special welcome board is placed at the entrance of the National Park, at the Check-post, which is 7 km before reaching Vattavada.  These days the National Park is open to the tourists with payment, and the accompaniment of the forest officers, for the safety of the forest as well as of the people.  The evergreen trees and the water sources become the habitat of various birds and animals. This thick green forest is situated almost 35 km away from Munnar, towards the road to Koviloor and Vattavada.

Nearby villages 
The adjacent villages beyond the National Park are Urkkad, Vattavada, Koviloor, and Kottakamboor, with its rich vegetable cultivations.

References

External links

National parks in Kerala
Protected areas established in 2003
2003 establishments in Kerala
Protected areas of Kerala
Tourist attractions in Idukki district
Geography of Idukki district